Dhirendranath Basu (1 March 1918 – 11 January 1990) was an Indian politician. A member of the Indian National Congress, he was elected to the Lok Sabha, the lower house of the Parliament of India from Katwa, West Bengal in 1977 as a member of the Indian National Congress.

Bas died on 11 January 1990, at the age of 71.

References

External links
 Official biographical sketch in Parliament of India website

1918 births
1990 deaths
India MPs 1977–1979
Indian National Congress politicians
Lok Sabha members from West Bengal
People from Purba Bardhaman district